Antihuala or Antiguala,(mapudungum: anti: sun; huala: duck.) is a town in the Los Álamos commune of the Arauco Province, Bío Bío Region, of Chile. On February 5, 1558, during the Arauco War, Pedro de Avendaño with sixty men captured the Mapuche Caupolicán lonco of Pilmaiquén and the Mapuche Gran Toqui nearby Antihuala encamped with a small band of followers. He was taken back to Cañete, where its corregidor Alonso de Reinoso tried him for rebellion and executed him by impalement.

Geography of Biobío Region